Jan Thilo Kehrer (born 21 September 1996) is a German professional footballer who plays as a defender for Premier League club West Ham United and the Germany national team. Mainly a centre-back, he can also play in either full-back position.

Club career

Schalke 
Kehrer is a graduate of Schalke 04. He made his Bundesliga debut on 6 February 2016 against VfL Wolfsburg in a 3–0 home win. He scored his first goal for the club on 1 April 2017 in the Revierderby against Borussia Dortmund at home, producing the equalizer in a 1–1 draw.

On 5 May 2018 he scored twice as Schalke secured second place in the Bundesliga for the 2017–18 season and UEFA Champions League football for the 2018–19 season.

Paris Saint-Germain 
On 16 August 2018, it was announced that Kehrer had been transferred to Ligue 1 club Paris Saint-Germain for €37 million.

On 10 April 2019, Kehrer scored his first goal for Paris Saint-Germain, in a league match against Strasbourg that ended 2–2. He scored his second goal for the club in a 2–1 league win away to Nantes on 4 February 2020. On 24 July 2020, in the Coupe de France Final, Kehrer suffered an injury and was replaced by Colin Dagba. PSG went on to win the match 1–0.

On 7 November 2020, Kehrer came off injured in a match against Rennes. He was set to miss three to four months of action due to an adductor injury. His recovery proved to be faster than expected, and he made his return to play as a substitute in a 3–1 win against Manchester United in the UEFA Champions League group stage on 2 December.

West Ham United 

On 17 August 2022, Kehrer signed for West Ham United on a four-year contract with the option of an additional two years. The transfer fee was reported to be £10.1m.

International career
Kehrer is a youth international for Germany. Kehrer won the U-21 Euros in 2017 and has captained the German U-21s against Kosovo, Azerbaijan and Israel.

Kehrer was called up to the full Germany squad for the first time on 29 August 2018, for Germany's opening 2018–19 UEFA Nations League match against France and the friendly against Peru.

Personal life
Kehrer was born in Germany to a German father and a Burundian mother.

He supports the peace and development organisation Anstoß zur Hoffnung e.V. (engl.: Kickoff to hope). Through his support, socially disadvantaged people in his mother’s homeland find hope and help.

Career statistics

Club

International

Honours
Paris Saint-Germain
Ligue 1: 2018–19, 2019–20, 2021–22
 Coupe de France: 2019–20, 2020–21; runner-up: 2018–19
 Coupe de la Ligue: 2019–20
Trophée des Champions: 2019
UEFA Champions League runner-up: 2019–20

Germany U21
UEFA European Under-21 Championship: 2017

References

External links

 Thilo Kehrer at West Ham United F.C.
 
 
 
 
 
 

1996 births
Living people
Sportspeople from Tübingen
Footballers from Baden-Württemberg
German footballers
Association football defenders
Bundesliga players
Regionalliga players
Ligue 1 players
Premier League players
FC Schalke 04 players
FC Schalke 04 II players
Paris Saint-Germain F.C. players
West Ham United F.C. players
Germany youth international footballers
Germany under-21 international footballers
Germany international footballers
2022 FIFA World Cup players
German expatriate footballers
Expatriate footballers in England
Expatriate footballers in France
German expatriate sportspeople in England
German expatriate sportspeople in France
German people of Burundian descent
German sportspeople of African descent